Homework is schoolwork assigned to be completed outside of class.   

Homework may also refer to:

Film
 Homework (1982 film), an American comedy starring Joan Collins
 Homework (1989 film), an Iranian documentary by Abbas Kiarostami
 Homework (1991 film), a Mexican drama by Jaime Humberto Hermosillo
 Homework (2011 film) or The Art of Getting By, an American romantic comedy-drama

Music

Albums
 Homework (Atomic Rooster album), 2008
 Homework (Daft Punk album), 1997
 Homework (Sunny Murray, Bob Dickie, and Robert Andreano album), 1997
 Homework (EP), by Darren Criss, 2017
 Homework, an EP by Sam Fischer, 2020
 Homework, an EP by Straw, 2000

Songs
 "Homework", a song written by Irving Berlin, c. 1947–1951
 "Homework", a song by the Bicycles from The Good, the Bad and the Cuddly, 2006
 "Homework", a song by Kim Petras, 2019

Other uses 
 "Homework" (short story), a 2007 story by Helen Simpson
 Home Work Convention, an International Labor Organization treaty